Rick Schwartz is an American film and television producer and financier based in New York, whose credits include The Departed, Black Swan, Gangs of New York, Machete, The Others, and Lip Sync Battle.

He has contributed articles to The Huffington Post, Times of London, ESPN's Grantland, and The Daily Beast.

Career
Schwartz began his film career at Miramax under Harvey and Bob Weinstein, working there for seven years and eventually serving as the company's senior vice president of production. At Miramax, Schwartz oversaw the development and production of projects including Martin Scorsese’s Gangs of New York, and The Departed, and Alejandro Amenabar’s The Others.

In 2008, Schwartz founded Overnight Productions, which has financed and produced movies by directors including Robert Rodriguez, Darren Aronofsky and Gela Babluani.

Later, Schwartz partnered with American financier, Jeremy Frommer to develop a technology company. He co-founded Jerrick Media, a producer and distributor of digital media content, in 2013.

Filmography
He was a producer in all films unless otherwise noted.

Film

Miscellaneous crew

Production manager

Thanks

Television

References

External links
 

1967 births
Living people
20th-century American Jews
Film producers from New York (state)
Television producers from New York City
21st-century American Jews